Joseph Bonnnaire (Saint-Chef, 9 August 1842 – 4 August 1910, Lyons) was a French rose breeder who is recognized for his work in Lyons, France, in the development of Hybrid tea roses and Tea roses. He opened his own nursery in 1878 in Monplaisir, at this time a suburb of Lyons.

He especially creates varieties with pastel and refined tones. His rose "Madame Joseph Bonnaire" (1891), dedicated to his wife, is still present in contemporary international catalogs.

Among the forty of his creations, we can distinguish:
"Souvenir de Victor Hugo" (1884)
"Dr. Grill" (1884)
"Madame Ernest Piard" (1887)
"Mademoiselle Jeanne Guillaumez" (1889)
"Souvenir d'Auguste Legros" (1889)
"Elisa Fugier" (1890)
"Madame Joseph Bonnaire" (1891)
"Mademoiselle Joséphine Marot" (1894)

Notes

Bibliography 
Nathalie Ferrand, Les Rosiéristes de la région lyonnaise : élaboration des variétés, études des marchés (1873-1939) read online, in Ruralia, 2007

1842 births
1910 deaths
Rose breeders
French gardeners